Kuş Island (literally "Bird Island"), also called Arter Island,  is a small island in Lake Van, Turkey. It is now uninhabited but formerly contained a small monastery, the ruins of which can still be seen.

See also
 List of islands of Turkey

External links
The monastery of the Mother Of God on Arter island

Islands of Lake Van
Uninhabited islands of Turkey
Islands of Van Province
Islands of Turkey